Jin (晉; 883 (or 896 or 907)–923), also known as Hedong (河東) and Former Jin (前晉) in Chinese historiography, was a dynastic state of China and the predecessor of the Later Tang dynasty. Its princely rulers were the ethnic Shatuo warlords Li Keyong and Li Cunxu (Li Keyong's son). Although the Five Dynasties period began only in 907, Li Keyong's territory which centered around modern Shanxi can be referred to as Jin as early as 896, when he was officially created the Prince of Jin by the failing and powerless Tang dynasty court, or even (by extension, anachronistically) as early as 883, when he was created the jiedushi military governor of Hedong Circuit, which controlled more or less the same territory.

History
The Jin rulers Li Keyong and Li Keyong's son Li Cunxu, of Shatuo extraction, claimed to be the rightful subjects of the defunct Tang dynasty (618–907), in a struggle against the usurper state of the Later Liang dynasty.

At the time of the Tang dynasty's fall in 907, the Jin state consisted of most of Shanxi (Linfen, Hezhong, Jincheng, Qinyang were taken by Later Liang) and several parts of Inner Mongolia. In 912, Jin took over Jincheng and in 913, conquered Yan, and eventually expanded to cover all of the territory north of the Yellow River.  Eventually, in 923, Li Cunxu, claiming rightful succession to the Tang throne, declared himself emperor, transitioning his state to the Later Tang dynasty, which shortly after destroyed the Later Liang dynasty.

 

Former countries in Chinese history
10th-century establishments in China
907 establishments
923 disestablishments
10th-century disestablishments in China
States and territories established in the 900s
States and territories disestablished in the 920s
History of Shanxi